Moiz Bakhiet is a Swedish - Sudanese Professor. He is the chairman (Founder) of the department of molecular medicine at the Arabian Gulf University and the CEO (Founder) of Princess Al-Jawhara Center for Molecular Medicine, Genetics and Inherited Diseases in the Kingdom of Bahrain. He is also a neurologist at the Bahrain Royal Medical Services, the King Hamad University Hospita and currently King Abdulla Medical City in the Bahraini capital, Manama.

Biography
He received his MBBS in 1985 from the Faculty of Medicine, University of Khartoum and his PhD in Medical Sciences in 1993 from Karolinska Institutet, Stockholm, Sweden. He also obtained a Clinical Specialty in Neurology in 1993 from the Swedish Board of Health and Welfare.

Professor Moiz Bakhiet published more than 150 papers in high rated scientific journals, with several International patents. He is an active member in many International Scientific and Medical Societies and Associations.

In the field of Literature and Thought, Professor Moiz Bakhiet Published 16 poetry books which have been collected recently in four full collections of poetry. He participated in more than 100 National, Regional and International poem festivals and recitations and won several prices.

He also has several creativity contributions in many cultural, intellectual and creative forums in different countries of the world such as the Mirbad Festival in Iraq in 1987, the XIII Ramtha Festival of Arabic poetry, Jordan, 13–18 August 2007. He presented several poem recitation in many Arab cities and in Europe, Americas and Asia and hosted by several TVs, radio and Arab and Western satellite channels.

He is one of the founders of the Arab Swedish Cultural Society, Chairman of the Association of Culture and Cultural Secretary of the Association of Medical Students at the University of Bahrain, provider of television programs and TV late shows in Bahrain from 1985 until 1989 and a Founder of a major cultural forum on the Internet

In press and media, Professor Moiz Bakhiet has many writings releases, articles and poems since the beginning of the eighties in the undergraduate until now.

Professor Bakhiet is a founder of the Sudanese Movement for Change.

References

External links
Official website

Living people
Academic staff of the Arabian Gulf University
University of Khartoum alumni
Karolinska Institute alumni
Year of birth missing (living people)